The Worst of Evil is an upcoming South Korean crime action television series starring Ji Chang-wook, Wi Ha-joon, and Im Se-mi. It is slated to premiere on Disney+ in the second half of 2023.

Synopsis 
Set in the 1990s, The Worst of Evil follows undercover police investigators who infiltrate a massive criminal organization responsible for the illegal drug trade between Korea, China and Japan.

Cast 
 Ji Chang-wook as Park Joon-mo
 A police officer who infiltrates a gang to investigate drugs.
 Wi Ha-joon as Jung Gi-cheol
 The leader of a criminal organization.
 Im Se-mi as Yoo Eui-jung
 Park Joon-mo's wife who is a narcotics officer.

References

External links 
 
 

Upcoming television series
Star (Disney+) original programming
Korean-language television shows
2023 South Korean television series debuts
Television series about illegal drug trade
South Korean web series
2023 web series debuts
South Korean crime television series
South Korean action television series
Television series set in the 1980s